Buttermilk is a fermented dairy drink. Traditionally, it was the liquid left behind after churning butter out of cultured cream. As most modern butter in western countries is not made with cultured cream but uncultured sweet cream, most modern buttermilk in western countries is cultured separately. It is common in warm climates where unrefrigerated milk sours quickly.

Buttermilk can be drunk straight, and it can also be used in cooking. In making soda bread, the acid in buttermilk reacts with the raising agent, sodium bicarbonate, to produce carbon dioxide which acts as the leavening agent. Buttermilk is also used in marination, especially of chicken and pork.

Traditional buttermilk 
Originally, buttermilk referred to the liquid left over from churning butter from cultured or fermented cream. Traditionally, before the advent of homogenization, the milk was left to sit for a period of time to allow the cream and milk to separate. During this time, naturally occurring lactic acid-producing bacteria in the milk fermented it. This facilitates the butter churning process, since fat from cream with a lower pH coalesces more readily than that of fresh cream. The acidic environment also helps prevent potentially harmful microorganisms from growing, increasing shelf life.

Traditional buttermilk is still common in many Arabic, Indian, Nepalese, Pakistani, Finnish, Polish, and Dutch households, but rarely found in other Western countries. It is a common drink in many Indian and Nepalese homes, and often served with roasted maize. In the Arab world, buttermilk is a common beverage to be sold ice cold with other dairy products.

Cultured buttermilk

United States 

Cultured buttermilk was first commercially introduced in the United States in the 1920s. Commercially available cultured buttermilk is milk that has been pasteurized and homogenized, and then inoculated with a culture of Lactococcus lactis or Lactobacillus bulgaricus plus Leuconostoc citrovorum to simulate the naturally occurring bacteria in the old-fashioned product. The tartness of cultured buttermilk is primarily due to lactic acid produced by lactic acid bacteria while fermenting lactose, the primary sugar in milk. As the bacteria produce lactic acid, the pH of the milk decreases and casein, the primary milk protein, precipitates, causing the curdling or clabbering of milk. This process makes buttermilk thicker than plain milk. While both traditional and cultured buttermilk contain lactic acid, traditional buttermilk tends to be less viscous than cultured buttermilk.

When introduced in America, cultured buttermilk was popular among immigrants, and was viewed as a food that could slow aging. It reached peak annual sales of 517,000,000 kg (1.14 billion lbs.) in 1960. Buttermilk's popularity has declined since then, despite an increasing population, and annual sales in 2012 reached less than half that number.

However, condensed buttermilk and dried buttermilk remain important in the food industry. Liquid buttermilk is used primarily in the commercial preparation of baked goods and cheese. Buttermilk solids are used in ice cream manufacturing, as well as being added to pancake mixes to make buttermilk pancakes.

Acidified buttermilk 
Acidified buttermilk is a substitute made by adding a food-grade acid such as white vinegar or lemon juice to milk. It can be produced by mixing 1 tablespoon of acid with 1 cup of milk and letting it sit until it curdles after about 10 minutes. Any level of fat content for the milk ingredient may be used, but whole milk is usually used for baking.

Nutrition 
Commercially produced buttermilk is comparable to regular milk in terms of food energy and fat. One cup (237 mL) of whole milk contains  and 8.9 grams of fat. One cup of whole buttermilk contains  and 8.1 grams of total fat. Low-fat buttermilk is also available. Buttermilk contains vitamins, potassium, calcium, and traces of phosphorus.

See also 
 Butterfat, the fatty portion from which butter is made
 List of dairy products
 Ranch dressing, a buttermilk-based salad dressing
 Sarasson, a cheese spread made from buttermilk
 Whey, the liquid left over after producing cheese
 Creole cream cheese, traditional Louisiana cheese made from buttermilk

References

External links 

 Making cultured buttermilk

By-products
Bulgarian drinks
Cuisine of Northern Ireland
Fermented dairy products
Dutch cuisine
Milk-based drinks
Ukrainian drinks